Petals Have Fallen is the second album by DELS. It was released through Ninja Tune imprint, Big Dada on 3 November 2014 on vinyl, CD and digital format.

Track listing

Personnel

Art Direction and Design – Dels
Cover Painting – Arth Daniels
Executive Producer – Kwes.
Management – Toby Donnelly
Mastered By – Max
Mixed By – Blue May (tracks: 3); Kwes. (tracks: 1, 2, 4, 5, 6, 7, 8, 9, 10, 11)

Coby Sey version

Petals Have Fallen is an instrumental single released by Coby Sey on 31 May 2017, three years after the release of the vocal track by DELS and Tirzah and album of the same name by DELS.

References

2014 albums
Dels albums
Big Dada albums
Albums produced by Kwes